The Witan was a council of noblemen in Anglo-Saxon England.

Witan may also refer to:

Witan International College
Witan Investment Trust